Admiralteysky, Admiralteyskaya or Admiralteyskoye may refer to:

Places
 Admiralteysky District, a district of Saint Petersburg, Russia
 Admiralteysky Municipal Okrug, a municipal okrug of Admiralteysky District of Saint Petersburg, Russia
 Admiralteyskaya (Saint Petersburg Metro), a station of the Saint Petersburg Metro, Saint Petersburg, Russia
 Admiralty Embankment (Admiralteyskaya naberezhnaya), a street along the Neva River in Saint Petersburg, Russia

See also
 Admiralty (disambiguation)
 Novo-Admiralteysky Bridge, a planned bridge in Saint Petersburg, Russia